Dešilovo a village in the municipality of Merošina, Serbia.

See also
Šilovo (disambiguation)

References

Populated places in Nišava District